The Deutsch-Baltische Gesellschaft ("German-Baltic Society") is an organization which represents Baltic German refugees expelled from Estonia and Latvia during World War II and its aftermath. It was established in 1950 as the Deutsch-Baltische Landsmannschaft im Bundesgebiet.

The organization is based in Darmstadt, Hesse. Its youth organization is the Deutschbaltischer Jugend- und Studentenring.

Society Chairman 
 Georg von Manteuffel-Szoege (1950-1962) 
 Axel de Vries (1962-1963 comm.) 
 Erik von Sivers (1963-1973) 
 Rudolf von Wistinghausen (1973-1980) 
 Klas Lackschewitz (1980-1984) 
 Hans Erich Seuberlich (1984) 
 Runar of Sivers (1985-1989) 
 Waltraut Dame von Tiesenhausen (1989-1996) 
 Heinz-Adolf Treu (1996-2005) 
 Eckhart Neander (2005-2010) 
 Frank von Auer (2010-2015) 
 Christian von Boetticher (since October 31, 2015)

Corporate members 
 Carl-Schirren-Gesellschaft e.  V. - German-Baltic cultural work 
 German Baltic youth and student ring e. V. 
 German Baltic Studienstiftung 
 German-Baltic Genealogical Society (DBGG) 
 German-Baltic church service eV (auxiliary committee of the ev.-luth. Deutschbalten) 
 Baltic monuments eV

See also
Nazi–Soviet population transfers
 Flight and expulsion of Germans (1944–1950)
 Federation of Expellees
 All-German Bloc/League of Expellees and Deprived of Rights

References

External links
Deutsch-Baltische Gesellschaft 
Deutschbaltischer Jugend- und Studentenring 

Organizations established in 1950
Landsmannschaften
 
1950 establishments in West Germany